The Outcasts was a 1961 Australian television serial. A period drama, it was broadcast live, though with some film inserts. All 12 episodes of the serial survive as kinescope recordings. It was a sequel to Stormy Petrel.

Plot
The Outcasts told the story of William Redfern and his attempts to build a hospital in Sydney in 1808.

Cast
Ron Haddrick as William Redfern
Henry Gilbert as Governor Lachlan Macquarie
John Gray as Reverend Samuel Marsden
Neil Fitzpatrick as Martin O'Brien
Amber Mae Cecil as Sarah Willis/Redfern
Lyndall Barbour as Mrs Willis
Frank Waters as Edward Willis
Ben Gabriel as Dr Jamieson
Edward Howell as Dr D'Arcy Wentworth
Margo Lee as Mrs John MacArthur
Leonard Bullen as JT Campbell
John Unicomb as H.C. Antill
Lynne Murphy as Mrs Macquarie
Walter Sullivan as John MacArthur
Delia Williams as Mary O'Connell
Philip Ross as W.C. Wentworth
Carolyn Keely as Eliza Antill
James Condon as Maurice O'Connell
Al Thomas as Francis Greenway
Jo Coco as Surgeon Bohan
Madeleine Howell as woman shopper
Julian Flett as butler
Stan Polonski
Sophy Milo
Patricia Johnson
Joe Coco
Les Brooks
Arthur Jollow
Alan Graham

Episodes
Ep 1–28 May (Syd), 25 Jun (Melb) - "The New Governor" - starts in September 1808, when former convict William Redfern is admitted as a surgeon in New South Wales. He helps Governor Macquarie when the latter's wife is pregnant and clashes with Reverend Samuel Marsden. Sarah Willis wishes to marry Redfern.
Ep 2–4 June (Syd), 2 July (Melb) - "Bond and Free" - Macquarie and Marsden argue over whether to invite Redfern to dinner. The invitation impresses Edward Willis, a wealthy settler who did not approve of Redfern and his daughter.
Ep 3–11 June (Syd), 9 July (Melb) - "The Vision Grows"
Ep 4–18 June (Syd), 16 July (Melb) - "Re enter John MacArthur"
Ep 5–25 June (Syd), 23 July (Melb) - "The System"
Ep 6–2 July (Syd), 30 July (Melb) - "Barrier Breached" - the Blue Mountains are crossed
Ep 7–9 July (Syd), 6 Aug (Melb) - "Another Lachlan" - a son for Governor Macquarie is born
Ep 8–16 July (Syd), 13 Aug (Melb) - "The Trouble Makers" - Redfern and Sarah move into their new hospital.
Ep 9–23 July (Syd), 20 Aug (Melb) - "The Exile's Return" - MacArthur Returns to the Colony.
Ep 10–30 July (Syd) 27 Aug (Melb) - "The Showdown" - Macquarie's Administration Investigated
Ep 11–6 August (Syd), 3 Sept (Melb) "The Final Challenge" - Gilbert's Appointment Opposed.
Ep 12 - 13 Aug (Syd) 10 Sept (Melb) - "Victory"

Production
Stormy Petrel, written by Rex Rienits and Colin Dean, had been a big success for the ABC. In November 1960 it was announced Dean and Rienits would reunite for a serial about William Redfern.

In March 1961 Dean said "it has not quite the clear, dramatic line of 'Stormy Petrel'. It involves more people, and although it lacks the central issue of the rebellion, much more happens in 'The Outcasts,' which covers from 1808 to 1822. 'The Outcasts' illustrates the change in the colony — Macquarie's policy of building up a settlement rather than administering it as a penal colony."

There was a cast of 42. A huge set was built to replicate George Street. Star Ron Haddrick was best known for his theatre work at the time.

Reception
Reviewing the pilot episode the Sunday Sydney Morning Herald said "ABN 2 looks as though its done it again... I would say that it has another winner and one that might outclass its predecessor...It hasn't yet got as strong a central figure as Bligh... but, on the other hand , it set the pace and established the theme much more rapidly than the Bligh series which was a little slow to develop."

The Woman's Weekly said the story "seems closer to present-day Australia in its lasting effects than the Bligh rebellion, with its high life at Government House, its turbulence, and its drama. "The Outcasts" is a quieter story, made up of more of the everyday events of life... "The Outcasts" is interesting and excellent TV. I know I'll make great efforts not to miss an episode."

The Bulletin said "For   those   who   like   their   historical   drama   presented   in   the   Alfred   Dampier   manner,   with   shouting,   weeping,   oppression   of   the   weak,   all   the   characters   pure-white   or  pure-black   in   morals   and   the   dialogue   scissored   out   of  volumes   seven   to   ten   of   the   “Historical   Records   of   Australia,”   the   series   is   good,   clean   fun.   But   viewers   should  not   take   them   as   historical   gospel."

Sequel
In January 1962 the ABC announced there would be a third series, making it a historical trilogy. It would focus on Darling versus Wentworth.

References

External links
 

Australian drama television series
1961 Australian television series debuts
1961 Australian television series endings
Australian Broadcasting Corporation original programming
Black-and-white Australian television shows
English-language television shows
Australian live television series
Period television series
Television shows set in colonial Australia